Sérgio Roberto de Braga Filho known as Serginho (little Sérgio) (born 16 September 1984) is a Brazilian footballer.

He sometimes known as Serginho Catarinense (Serginho of Santa Catarina state).

Biography

Santa Catarina clubs
Sérgio Filho (Filho means son, equivalent to Jr.) or Serginho started his career at Joinville Esporte Clube, which he signed a 4-year contract in January 2004. He appeared in 2004 Campeonato Brasileiro Série B as unused sub, and played twice at 2005 Campeonato Brasileiro Série C. In the next season, he played all 12 Série C matches for the club, which he also played the same number of games in 2007 season. He extended his contract for one more year in November 2007.

In June 2008 he left for Grêmio Esportivo Juventus until end of year, along with Joinville team-mate Tácio. He finished as the runner-up at Campeonato Catarinense Divisão Especial (Second Division) with team.

In December 2008 he left for Marcílio Dias until the end of 2009 Campeonato Catarinense. In June he re-joined Juventus., finished as the Campeonato Catarinense Divisão Especial runner-up again.

Paraná clubs
He left his native Santa Catarina state for the first time in January 2010, which he was signed by Operário Ferroviário Esporte Clube of Paraná, which he also known as Serginho Catarinense at that time and partnered with Sérgio Mendes Coimbra (aka Serginho Paulista) in the midfield. In May he returned to Santa Catarina for Chapecoense and in August signed by Paraná Clube after not included in Chapecoense's squad for 2010 Campeonato Brasileiro Série C. Chapecoense received some transfer fee as he had a few months left in his contract. Serginho played 12 games in 2010 Campeonato Brasileiro Série B for Paraná.

He returned to Operário in January 2011 along with Serginho Paulista. Paraná also signed another Serginho (also midfielder) that month.

In May he left for Sociedade Esportiva Alvorada Club in 1-year contract. He was loaned to Novo Hamburgo in August for 2011 Copa FGF.

Honours
Champion
Campeonato Catarinense Divisão Série A2/Divisão Especial: 2005, 2006, 2007 (Joinville)
Runner-up
Campeonato Catarinense: 2006 (Joinville)
Campeonato Catarinense Divisão Especial: 2008, 2009 (Juventus)
Copa Santa Catarina: 2007

References

External links
 

Brazilian footballers
Joinville Esporte Clube players
Associação Chapecoense de Futebol players
Paraná Clube players
Association football midfielders
People from Joinville
1984 births
Living people
Sportspeople from Santa Catarina (state)